Kim Jong-im is a North Korean politician. She is one of the few women (among others, Kim Kyong-hui, Kim Rak-hui and Han Kwang-bok) who perform the highest functions in the North Korean government apparatus. She is a member of the Central Committee of the Workers' Party of Korea and was a member of the Supreme People's Assembly.

Biography
In 1985 she became the deputy director of the Party History Institute, formally an organizational unit of the Central Committee of the Workers' Party of Korea. From December 2009 she is the head of the Institute, replacing Kim Ki-nam. Pursuant to the decision of the 3rd Conference of the Korean Workers' Party, on September 28, 2010, Kim was elected for the first time to the Central Committee. In 2009 she was elected to the 12th convocation of the Supreme People's Assembly, representing the 157th electoral district. In 2016 she was elected full member of the 7th Central Committee of the Workers' Party of Korea.

After the death of Kim Jong Il in December 2011, Kim Jong-im was ranked in 41st place in the 232-person Funeral Committee.

References

Members of the Supreme People's Assembly
Workers' Party of Korea politicians
21st-century North Korean women politicians
21st-century North Korean politicians
Living people
Year of birth missing (living people)